Idioglossa thailandica is a species of moth of the family Batrachedridae. It is known from Kanchanaburi, Thailand.

The wingspan is about 8 mm. The forewings of this species are chrome-yellowish, mottled with dark brownish scales and a silvery streak at one-fifth.

References

Moths described in 2004
Batrachedridae